Misty Dawn Plowright (born 1983) is one of the first two openly transgender people in the United States to become a candidate representing a major political party for a national office, the other being Misty Snow. She was the first openly transgender candidate to win a major party primary for the House of Representatives. She went on to challenge incumbent Republican Doug Lamborn representing  in the 2016 general election. Plowright lost to Lamborn on November 8, 2016.

Early life and career
Plowright was born in California, and at the age of four moved to northwest Arkansas where she was raised as a Southern Baptist. She is a U.S. Army veteran, serving as an Information Systems Operator/Analyst from 2003 to 2004. After sustaining a non-combat injury, she was honorably discharged and went on to work in information technology.

Congressional campaign

Her official campaign website was launched on March 31, 2016, the International Transgender Day of Visibility. She ran as a progressive and was openly supportive of Bernie Sanders's presidential campaign. After he lost the nomination to Hillary Clinton, she was considering voting for Green nominee Jill Stein, stating that she would only vote for Clinton if she "actually truly believed that Trump was Hitler 2.0 and he was actually going to do that level of evil."

Plowright lost to incumbent Doug Lamborn in the general election, who won his sixth term. She conceded the race the next day.

Personal life
Plowright lives in Colorado Springs, Colorado with her wife, Lisa. The couple entered a domestic partnership in Seattle in 2010. After changes in legislation, they were legally married in 2014. They are in a polyamorous relationship with their mutual partner, Sebastian.

Electoral history

See also
 Misty Snow

References

External links

 

1983 births
Candidates in the 2016 United States elections
Colorado Democrats
American LGBT politicians
LGBT people from Colorado
Living people
People from California
Politicians from Colorado Springs, Colorado
Polyamorous people
Transgender politicians
Transgender women
United States Army soldiers